Adriana Iturbide Ibarra (born 27 March 1993) is a Mexican footballer who plays as a forward for Club Atlas and the Mexico women's national team.

International career
Iturbide made her senior debut for Mexico on 27 February 2019 in a friendly match against Italy.

International goals
Scores and results list Mexico's goal tally first

References

External links 
 

1993 births
Living people
Footballers from Guadalajara, Jalisco
Mexican women's footballers
Women's association football forwards
Liga MX Femenil players
Atlas F.C. (women) footballers
Mexico women's international footballers
21st-century Mexican women
20th-century Mexican women
Mexican footballers